PAIX, the 'Palo Alto Internet eXchange', was a neutral Internet exchange point.

PAIX began operations in 1996 as Palo Alto Internet Exchange in Palo Alto, California, and was owned and operated by Digital Equipment Corporation, or DEC. In its early days, it used a DELNI as its interconnection infrastructure.

AboveNet acquired PAIX, and later sold it to Switch and Data around the time that AboveNet filed for chapter 11 bankruptcy protection.

Switch and Data  provided peering and Internet exchange points  in Atlanta; Dallas; Miami; New York City; Palo Alto; Philadelphia; San Jose, California; Seattle; and Vienna, Virginia; among other places.

Equinix acquired PAIX from Switch and Data April 2010.  It then became an Equinix Internet Exchange.

References 

Internet exchange points in the United States
1996 establishments in California
Companies formerly based in Palo Alto, California